The Sheik Karimol Makhdum Mosque is located in Barangay Tubig Indangan, Simunul, Tawi-Tawi, the Philippines.  It is the oldest mosque in the Philippines and in Southeast Asia, according to local folklore, it was built by an Arab trader named Sheikh Makhdum Karim in 1380. It was first thought that the pillars of the old mosque found within the current mosque are the pillars of the original allegedly built in 1380. However, studies from the National Museum of the Philippines have confirmed that the pillars found within the present mosque dates back to the 17th century. The four pillars are regarded as sacred and have high status in Philippine culture as they are at least 400 years old and are the oldest known Islamic artifacts in the entire Philippines. The mosque has been declared as a National Historical Landmark by the National Historical Commission and a National Cultural Treasure by the National Museum.

See also
 Makhdum Karim
 Islam in the Philippines
List of the oldest mosques

References

External links
 Sulu, North Borneo Sultan Hails Senate Bill Declaring RP’s Oldest Mosque As National Shrine, Zamboanga Journal on November 28, 2006
 flickr.com: Oldest Mosque in the Philippines

Mosques in Mindanao
Buildings and structures in Tawi-Tawi
National Cultural Treasures of the Philippines
National Historical Landmarks of the Philippines
Mosques completed in 1380